Torcieu is a commune in the Ain department in eastern France.

Geography
The village lies in the middle of the commune, on the right bank of the river Albarine, which flows west through the commune.

Population

See also
Communes of the Ain department

References

Communes of Ain
Ain communes articles needing translation from French Wikipedia